The 29th Golden Rooster Awards honoring best Chinese language films which presents during 2012–13. Award ceremony was held in Wuhan, Hubei Province, hosted by Tu Jingwei, broadcast by CCTV Movie Channel.

Schedule

Winners and nominees

Special awards
 Lifetime Achievement Award
Yu Min(Screenwriter)
Liu Xuerao(Art Director)
 Special Jury Award
 Film:Back to 1942 
 Filmmaker: Wu Tianming

References

External links 
 Result of 29th Golden Rooster Awards

2012-2013
Golden
Gold